Lizawice railway station is a station in Lizawice, Lower Silesian Voivodeship, Poland.

Connections 

132 Bytom - Wrocław Główny

Train Services

The station is served by the following service(s):

Regional services (PR) Wrocław Główny - Oława - Brzeg
Regional services (PR) Wrocław Główny - Oława - Brzeg - Nysa
Regional service (PR) Wrocław - Oława - Brzeg - Nysa - Kędzierzyn-Koźle
Regional services (PR) Wrocław Główny - Oława - Brzeg - Opole Główne
Regional service (PR) Wrocław - Oława - Brzeg - Opole Główne - Kędzierzyn-Koźle
Regional service (PR) Wrocław - Oława - Brzeg - Opole Główne - Kędzierzyn-Koźle - Racibórz
Regional service (PR) Wrocław - Oława - Brzeg - Opole Główne - Gliwice

References 

Oława County
Railway stations in Lower Silesian Voivodeship
Railway stations in Poland opened in 1842